There are several 2018 UCI World Championships. The International Cycling Union (UCI) holds World Championships every year. For 2018, this includes:

 2018 UCI Road World Championships
 2018 UCI Track Cycling World Championships
 2018 UCI Mountain Bike World Championships
 2018 UCI Cyclo-cross World Championships
 2018 UCI BMX World Championships
 2018 UCI Urban Cycling World Championships

UCI World Championships
UCI World Championships